COSARA (Comptoirs Saigonnais de Ravitaillements) was a Vietnamese aviation and transport company founded by Maurice Loubière. The company's office was located at 5–13, Turc Street, Saigon - now Ho Huan Nghiep Street, Ho Chi Minh City.

Origin of the company

Loubière was posted to the French 4th Colonial Artillery Regiment, based in Hanoi in 1929, to undertake his military service. He sailed from France of the Chargeurs Réunis. Once in Hanoi he learnt Vietnamese and became the regiment's interpreter. In September 1942, he started his own business, Les Comptoirs des Industries Locales, which provided provisions for the Army. Indo-China was controlled by the French Vichy government at this time although occupied by the Japanese.

On 9 September 1947 Loubière, along with one of his Vietnamese friends, founded COSARA (Comptoirs Saigonnais de Ravitaillements). The company's aim was to air freight supplies to army units scattered around Vietnam by using the airfields built by the Japanese during World War II.

First aircraft

In September 1947 COSARA leased an Amiot AAC.1 Toucan from  STA (Société Transatlantique Aérienne). The company was also granted the right to carry passengers between Saigon and Sóc Trăng, Phnom-Penh, and Laos. A second AAC.1 was leased from STA that same year. STA also became a shareholder in COSARA.
During the same period, COSARA also ran a trucking business to carry supplies from the airports to their destinations.   
In 1948 COSARA added three Swissair Douglas C-47's to its fleet.

An aviation branch, STAEO (Société Transatlantique Aérienne d’Extrême-Orient) was set up as a subsidiary of COSARA. The passenger routes were expanded to include Tourane, Huế, Hanoi, and Tayninh. By 1950 these were expanded again to include Phan Thiết, and Vientiane.

Prince Savang, Luang Prabang, Laos became a member of the board and Air France a shareholder.

War service

In 1949 COSARA provided assistance to the French Army during the First Indochina War by evacuating wounded soldiers from Sóc Trăng at its own expense. A gesture that earned the praise of General Blaizot.
In 1952 COSARA was nominated for the Grand Cross of the Legion of Honor military medal for transporting 230 military passengers from Saigon to Hanoi between 10 and 12 December 1951. Also that same year a COSARA C-47 was shot down on takeoff by the Viet Minh at Phan Thiet.

COSARA participated in Operation Cognac evacuating 6,000 people from North Vietnam to South Vietnam between 22 August and 4 October 1954 and tied in with the much larger Operation Passage to Freedom.

Growth and humanitarian aid
Four additional C-47s were added to COSARA's fleet between 1951 and 1953 and two Sud-Ouest SO.30 Bretagne's were added on 24 July 1952. The SO.30s were named Bac Hac and Van Huong From 1953 to 1954 a further two C-47s were added to the fleet along with five SO.30s.

During 1953 COSARA under its Vietnamese managing director, Mr Phạm Hòe, provided assistance to the Vietnamese Red Cross, transporting medical staff and supplies.

Demise

On 20 July 1954 Vietnam was partitioned into North and South Vietnam and by 1955 COSARA had ceased flying. Its C-47s were sold to Air Vietnam and its SO.30s to the French Navy. Its operations base at Tan Son Nhut was taken over by Air Vietnam and became an international airport. Maurice Loubière returned to France after the company ceased operations.

Fleet

Link for a detailed list of COSARA aircraft

References

External links
Saigon-vietnam.fr: COSARA

Defunct airlines of South Vietnam
Defunct airlines of Vietnam
Air Vietnam
Organizations of the First Indochina War
First Indochina War
French Fourth Republic
Airlines established in 1947
Airlines disestablished in 1955
1947 establishments in French Indochina
1947 establishments in Vietnam
1955 disestablishments in Vietnam
1940s in French Indochina
1950s in French Indochina
1940s in Vietnam
1950s in South Vietnam